Bommareddypally is a village in the mandal of Dharmaram in Peddapalli district in the state of Telangana in India.

Geography
Bommareddypally is a village, Surrounded by mountains and it is a forest area (VSS). This village is 3 km away from SH 7 Karimnagar to    Mancherial highwayroad.    

The village population is about 2000+ and equally balanced with different castes. The village has communities  of  Reddys, Padmashalis, Mudhiraj, Yadavs ,  SC and ST community. The villagers main occupation is agriculture.  Main crops are cotton, maize, paddy. 

The Village has a Govt Primary school, Anganwadi centre, health Centre and a post office. The village streets are covered with cement roads and street lights. The temples of this village are Nandi Mallanna Temple, Pochamma Temple, Hanuman Temple and Peddama Temple. The village is an example of a co-operative village. 

The village is provided with pure drinking water and it consists of two ponds and tanks. There is no water crisis in this village till now. The climate is temperate. All the festivals like Vinayaka Chavithi, Dussera, Diwali, and Sankranthi are celebrated in a grand Way.

Panchayats
The following is the list of village panchayats in Bommareddypally village. The village consists of 1400 voters.

2019 Elections Result in Bommareddypally

Villages in Peddapalli district